The Holy Innocents may refer to:

 The victims of the Biblical Massacre of the Innocents, and any of several artistic depictions of this massacre (e.g. by Giotto di Bondone)
 The Holy Innocents (Adair novel), by Gilbert Adair
 The Dreamers (2003 film), a film based, in part, on the Adair novel
 The Holy Innocents (Delibes novel), by Miguel Delibes
 The Holy Innocents (film), film based on the Delibes novel